Subway Express is a 1931 American pre-Code mystery film directed by Fred C. Newmeyer and starring Jack Holt, Aileen Pringle and Fred Kelsey.

Cast
 Jack Holt as Inspector Killian 
 Aileen Pringle as Dale Tracy 
 Fred Kelsey as Detective Kearney 
 Alan Roscoe as Edward Tracy 
 Jason Robards Sr. as Paul Bordon 
 Sidney Bracey as Herman Stevens 
 Selmer Jackson as Mason 
 William Humphrey as Mr. Cotton 
 Ethel Wales as Mrs. Cotton 
 Max Asher as Mr. Blotnick 
 Bertha Blackman as Mrs. Blotnick 
 Lillian Leighton as Mrs. Mary Mullins 
 James Goss as Mulvaney 
 Mason Williams as Prizefighter 
 Bert Linden as Sheck 
 Robert St. Angelo as Zippe 
 John Kelly as Motorman 
 Dorothy Bay as Miss Smith 
 Bob Kortman as Guard 
 Sally St. Clair as Flapper 
 Mary Gordon as Mrs. Delaney 
 Earl Seid as Sydney 
 Ginger Connolly as Thomas

References

Bibliography
 Goble, Alan. The Complete Index to Literary Sources in Film. Walter de Gruyter, 1999.

External links
 

1931 films
1931 mystery films
American mystery films
Films directed by Fred C. Newmeyer
Columbia Pictures films
American black-and-white films
1930s English-language films
1930s American films